Uaipán-tepui, also spelled Waipán, is a tepui in Bolívar state, Venezuela.

See also
 Distribution of Heliamphora

References

Tepuis of Venezuela
Mountains of Venezuela
Mountains of Bolívar (state)